Sohini Sengupta is an Indian film and theatre actress. Daughter of actor Rudraprasad Sengupta and Swatilekha Sengupta, who are also active in theatre, Sohini is one of the leading actors of the Bengali theatre group Nandikar. As a member of the group, she has worked with prominent theatre personalities such as Debshankar Halder, Sumanto Gangopadhyay and Parthapratim Deb, and was awarded Sangeet Natak Akademi's 2007 Ustad Bismillah Khan Yuva Puraskar for contributions to theatre. She also played a supporting role in Aparna Sen’s film Paromitar Ek Din (2000) for which she won the Best Supporting Actress award at the 2000 National Film Awards.

Personal life
Sengupta was born to parents Rudraprasad Sengupta and Swatilekha Sengupta in Kolkata. She was married to actor Goutam Halder till their divorce in 2006. In 2013 she married her co-actor Saptarshi Moulik at a private ceremony.

Filmography
 Paromitar Ek Din (2000)
 Icche (2011)
 Alik Sukh (2013)
 Belaseshe (2015)
 Posto (2017)
 Sanjhbati (2020)
 Abhijaan (2022)
 Aay Khuku Aay (2022)

Plays

Television
 Thakurmar Jhuli as Thakurma
 Khorkuto as Meghomala Mukherjee aka Putu Pishi
Sona Roder Gaan as Anandi
Guddi as Maammaam'

Awards and honours
 1999 - National Film Award for Best Supporting Actress for Paromitar Ek Din (as Sohini Haldar)
 2007 - Sangeet Natak Akademi Ustad Bismillah Khan Yuva Puraskar for her contribution to theatre.
 2013 - ABP Ananda Sera Bangali for Acting
 2020 - The Telegraph She Awards'' for her contribution to theatre.

Notes
 This was the first play where Swatilekha and Sohini– mother and daughter worked together.

References

External links

Bengali actresses
Bengali theatre personalities
Living people
Indian stage actresses
20th-century Indian actresses
21st-century Indian actresses
Actresses in Bengali cinema
Indian film actresses
Best Supporting Actress National Film Award winners
Year of birth missing (living people)